The 2008 AFF Championship qualification was held in Phnom Penh, Cambodia from 17 to 25 October 2008 for the five lower-ranked teams in Southeast Asia. All teams play in a round-robin tournament format and the top two teams of the group qualify for the tournament proper.

Venue

Results 
 All times are Indochina Time (ICT) – UTC+7.

Qualified Teams 
Teams who finished Top 2 on the group will qualify to the main tournament.

Goal scorers 

4 goals
  Sam El Nasa

3 goals
  Mohd Shahrazen Said
  Khim Borey
  Visay Phaphouvanin

2 goals
  Hardi Bujang
  Sun Sovannarith
  Alexander Borromeo
  Chad Gould
  Phayvanh Lounglath
  Lamnao Singto

1 goals
  Mohd Azwan Saleh
  Sallehuddin Damit
  Mohd Abu Bakar Mahari
  Chandalaphone Liepvisay
  Saynakhonevieng Phommapanya
  Ian Araneta
  Christopher Greatwich
  Rosito Soares
  José João Pereira
  Anggisu Barbosa
  Alfredo Esteves

qualification
2008 in Cambodian football
2008
2008 in Laotian football
2008 in Philippine football
2008 in Brunei football
2008 in East Timorese sport

de:ASEAN-Fußballmeisterschaft 2008#Qualifikation
nl:AFF Suzuki Cup 2008#Kwalificatietoernooi
th:เอเอฟเอฟ ซูซูกิ คัพ 2008#รอบคัดเลือก